Spy in the House of Love may refer to:

Books
 A Spy in the House of Love, a 1954 novel by Anaïs Nin

TV
 "Spy in the House of Love (Dollhouse)", Season 1, Episode 9 of the science fiction TV series Dollhouse

Music
 A Spy in the House of Love, a 1984 song by The dBs
 "Spy in the House of Love (song)", a 1987 song by Was (Not Was)
 A Spy in the House of Love (album), a 1990 album by The House of Love
 Spy in the House of Love, song by Steve Winwood 1997